or  is an island in Troms og Finnmark county, Norway. The  island is located entirely in Tjeldsund Municipality. North and west of the island lies the Tjeldsundet strait which separates it from the large island of Hinnøya; south of the island is the Ofotfjorden; and east of the island lies the Ramsundet strait which separates it from the mainland of Norway.

See also
List of islands of Norway

References

Tjeldsund
Islands of Troms og Finnmark